Rehalpura is a hamlet located in the Kangra district of Himachal Pradesh, India. It comes under Rihal Pura Panchayath. It is located 14 km towards South from Dharamshala and 164 km from State capital Shimla

Dharamshala, Hamirpur, Chamba and Dalhousie are the nearby Cities to Rehalpura.

References

External links

Villages in Kangra district